Šentovec ( or ) is a settlement in the Municipality of Slovenska Bistrica in northeastern Slovenia. It  lies in the hills just north of Slovenska Bistrica on the road towards Ritoznoj. The area is part of the traditional region of Styria. It is now included with the rest of the municipality in the Drava Statistical Region.

References

External links
Šentovec at Geopedia

Populated places in the Municipality of Slovenska Bistrica